John F. Ring is a corporate lawyer and former government official. Ring was a member of the National Labor Relations Board from 2018 to 2022, serving as chair from 2018 to 2021. He was formerly co-chair of the labor and employment law practice at Morgan, Lewis & Bockius, a pro-management law firm, where his practice included representing employers in collective bargaining, labor contracts, multi-employer benefit funds, and corporate restructurings.

Biography
Ring received his Bachelor of Arts and Juris Doctor from the Catholic University of America. He spent his whole career at Morgan, Lewis & Bockius, starting as an associate in 1988 and becoming a partner in 1999. He managed the firm's labor and management relations practice defending corporate interests in union environments. He has represented employers in unfair labor practice proceedings before the NLRB and served as counsel to the National Master Freight Agreement.

According to Bloomberg BNA, "President Donald Trump's appointees will control the National Labor Relations Board in 2018, and observers expect major changes in the agency’s philosophy and direction." According to The National Law Journal, "If confirmed, Ring would help the NLRB overturn policies criticized by the business community during the Obama administration." Ring's nomination was confirmed on April 11, 2018 by a vote of 50–48. He was sworn in on April 16, 2018, and served until December 16, 2022, when his term ended.

See also
 William Emanuel
 Marvin Kaplan
 Peter B. Robb

References

External links
 NLRB Chairman biography
 Biography at Morgan Lewis
 John F. Ring at the National Law Review

|-

https://today.westlaw.com/Document/I6d1d6a00869711ebaad082927e7b3c00/View/FullText.html?contextData=(sc.Default)&transitionType=Default&firstPage=true

Living people
20th-century American lawyers
21st-century American lawyers
Catholic University of America alumni
Columbus School of Law alumni
Lawyers from Washington, D.C.
National Labor Relations Board officials
Trump administration personnel
Year of birth missing (living people)